The 1926 All-Pro Team consists of American football players chosen by various selectors at the end of the 1926 season as the best players at their positions for the All-Pro teams of the National Football League (NFL) and American Football League (AFL). Selectors for the 1926 season included the Green Bay Press-Gazette poll, the Chicago Tribune, and Collyer's Eye. Three players were unanimously selected as first-team players by all three selectors: fullback Ernie Nevers, halfback/quarterback Paddy Driscoll, and tackle Ed Healey.

Selectors and key
For the 1926 season, there are three known selectors of All-Pro Teams. They are:

GB = A poll conducted by the Green Bay Press-Gazette identified first and second teams. The selections were limited to NFL players (excluding players in the AFL) and were based on polling of sports editors and pro football managers from 17 of the NFL cities.

CT = The Chicago Tribune'''s teams were selected by Wilfrid Smith, identified first and second teams, and were composed of both NFL and AFL players.

CE = Selected by E.G. Brands, a correspondent for Collyer's Eye'', a sports journal published in Chicago. The selections were limited to NFL players (excluding players in the AFL).

Players selected by multiple selectors as first-team All-Pros are displayed in bold typeface. Players who have been inducted into the Pro Football Hall of Fame are designated with a "†" next to their names.

Selections by position

Ends

Tackles

Guards

Centers

Quarterbacks

Halfbacks

Fullbacks

References

All-Pro Teams
1926 National Football League season